Holocraspedon flava is a moth of the family Erebidae. It was described by Rudolf van Eecke in 1927. It is found on Sumatra and possibly on Borneo.

The forewings are pale dull yellow and the hindwings are whitish.

References

Moths described in 1927
Lithosiini